Fionn Gibbons (born 12 June 2002) is an Irish rugby union player who is currently a member of Munster's academy as of the 2022–23 season. He plays as a centre primarily, but can also play on the wing, and represents Young Munster in the amateur All-Ireland League.

Munster
Gibbons joined year one of Munster's academy ahead of the 2022–23 season, and made his senior competitive debut for the province in their 2022–23 United Rugby Championship round four fixture against rivals Connacht on 7 October 2022, coming on as a 67th minute replacement for Ben Healy in Munster's 20–11 away defeat.

Ireland
Gibbons was a grand slam winner with Ireland under-20s in 2022, starting four of the five matches and scoring three tries, before also starting four matches and scoring three tries for the under-20s during the U20 Summer Series in the same year.

Honours

Ireland under-20s
Six Nations Under 20s Championship:
Winner (1): 2022
Grand Slam:
Winner (1): 2022
 Triple Crown:
 Winner (1): 2022

References

External links
Munster Profile
All Rugby Profile

2002 births
Living people
Irish rugby union players
People educated at Castleknock College
University College Dublin R.F.C. players
Young Munster players
Munster Rugby players
Rugby union centres
Rugby union wings